Eaton Township may refer to:

 Eaton Township, Michigan
 Eaton Township, Kearney County, Nebraska
 Eaton Township, Lorain County, Ohio
 Eaton Township, Warren County, Ohio, defunct
 Eaton Township, Wyoming County, Pennsylvania

Township name disambiguation pages